Three destroyers of Japan have been named :

 , an  launched in 2017

See also 
 Shiranui (disambiguation)

Imperial Japanese Navy ship names
Japanese Navy ship names